The Great Land of Small is a 1986 Canadian fantasy children's film. It was written by David Sigmund and directed by Vojtěch Jasný. The film starred Michael J. Anderson in one of his first roles. The film is the 5th in the Tales for All (Contes Pour Tous) series of children's movies created by Les Productions la Fête.

Plot
Two children, Jenny and David, meet a leprechaun-like creature called Fritz in the woods; however, his gold dust is being stolen by a wicked hunter. Only Mimmick the Indian knows that the creature is in our world. As the hunter becomes mad with power, he attempts to capture Fritz and the children. With Mimmick's help, they escape to the Land of Small, a mystical, magical land.

Cast
 Michael J. Anderson as Fritz and the King
 Karen Elkin as Jenny 
 Michael Blouin as David 
 Ken Roberts as Flannigan and Munch 
 Rodrigue Tremblay as Mimmick

Reception
The reviewer at the Canuxploitation website, which is devoted to Canadian B-movies, thought that The Great Land of Small was "a real oddity", labelling it "a half-baked fantasy". Although praising the inclusion of Cirque du Soleil, he thought of The Great Land of Small as one of Demers' least successful films. They thought that the film could be rated "W" for "What the Hell?", thereby reflecting the idea that it was "[w]eird" but "not trippy enough to be interesting". Arguing that the beginning of the film was "tediously padded", they thought that the subplot based around Mimmick and Flannigan was unnecessary, and that the actual Great Land of Small – while envisioned as a place like the Land of Oz or The Neverending Story's Fantasia – was "a distinct disappointment" due to its "embarrassingly low-budget production design, and cheap editing tricks".

References

External links

1986 films
1986 independent films
English-language Canadian films
Canadian independent films
Films shot in Montreal
Canadian children's fantasy films
1980s children's fantasy films
French-language Canadian films
1980s Canadian films